Culbone (also called Kitnor) is a hamlet consisting of little more than the parish church and a few houses, in the parish of Oare in the Exmoor National Park, Somerset, England. As there is no road access it is a two-mile walk from Porlock Weir, and some four miles from Porlock itself.

The village is situated in a sheltered spot, near the coast of Porlock Bay.

The South West Coast Path goes through the village, parts of which were closed and diverted in February 2007 following landslips in the woods. The woods around the village are home to the rare Sorbus vexans, a microspecies of self-cloning Sorbus trees which are only found in the coastal area between Culbone and Trentishoe in Devon. It is amongst the rarest trees in Britain. Other Whitebeam and Rowan species found in the area include; Sorbus subcuneata, Sorbus ‘Taxon D’ and Sorbus aucuparia.

History 

Culbone was listed in the Domesday book as Kytenore, or Chetnore.  The name "Culbone" is thought to derive from the Celtic cil beun''' for "Church of St Beuno".

The Culbone Stone, an early mediaeval standing stone approximately one metre in height. It lies in woodland close to the parish boundary, and features an incised wheeled cross, the style of which suggests it dates from 7th to 9th century. The stone is legally protected as a scheduled ancient monument. It has been suggested that the stone has been moved from its original site as part of the Culbone Hill Stone Row.

In the 14th century Culbone's steep woods were used as a colony for French prisoners, and again in 1720 as a prison colony. The woods were once the site of a major charcoal burning industry, the original burners for which were reputed to be a colony of lepers. Although the lepers were not allowed into the village, there is a small leper window in the north wall of the church.

Culbone was a civil parish until 1933 when, because of the small population (43 in 1931) it was merged into the parish of Oare.

Culbone Cottage, Culbone Lodge, and the Parsonage Farmhouse are all Grade II listed buildings.

 Church 

Culbone Church is said to be the smallest parish church in England. The chancel is  × , the nave
It seats about 30 and is dedicated to St Beuno. Services are still held there, despite the lack of road access. The church is probably pre-Norman in origin, with a 13th-century porch, and late 15th-century nave. It was refenestrated and reroofed around 1810 and the spirelet added in 1888. It underwent further restoration in 1928. It has been designated by English Heritage as a Grade I listed building.

 Samuel Taylor Coleridge 
The Person from Porlock is believed to have disturbed Samuel Taylor Coleridge during his composition of the oriental poem Kubla Khan''. Coleridge was living at Coleridge Cottage, Nether Stowey (between Bridgwater and Minehead). Coleridge later stated he wrote the poem at Brimstone Farm, though no such farm has ever existed. It is likely that this encounter took place while he was staying at either Broomstreet Farm or Ash Farm near Culbone.
It is also possible that Coleridge composed the poem at the Culbone Parsonage near to Ash Farm, now a collection of holiday cottages.

References

External links

 
 
 

Villages in West Somerset
Exmoor
Populated coastal places in Somerset
Former civil parishes in Somerset